Rawat P.G. Girls College is the only girls college in the Karni Vihar, Heerapura, Ajmer Road Jaipur district in the Indian state of Rajasthan. It offers undergraduate and postgraduate courses in arts, commerce, and sciences. It is affiliated to the University of Rajasthan. It was established in 2003.

Departments
The College offers a variety of courses under the respective University of Rajasthan:

Facilities
Library
E-Library
Biotechnology Laboratory
Chemistry Laboratory
Botany Laboratory
Zoology Laboratory
Physics Laboratory
Hostel

References

External links 
 Official website

Women's universities and colleges in Jaipur
Universities and colleges in Jaipur
University of Rajasthan